The Canterbury-Bankstown Bulldogs is a professional rugby league club in the National Rugby League (NRL), the premier rugby league football competition in Australia.

To date there have been over 800 first-grade players to wear the blue and white of the Bulldogs.

Based in Belmore, a suburb of Sydney, the Bulldogs in 1935 were admitted to the New South Wales Rugby League (NSWRL) competition, a predecessor of the current NRL competition.

Canterbury won its first premiership in just its fourth season (1938). At the time it made Canterbury the quickest club (barring the founding clubs) to win a premiership after admission to the competition, a record which was only recently beaten in 1999 by the Melbourne Storm. It won a second premiership in 1942 but then had to wait another 38 years before breaking through for a third title in 1980. During the 80s, the Bulldogs were a dominant force in the competition appearing in five Grand Finals, winning four of them. In the 90s they featured in the 1995 and 1998 Grand Finals, winning the former. Their most recent success was in 2004 when they beat the Sydney Roosters 16−13. The tryscorers were Hazem El Masri and Matt Utai, and the Clive Churchill Medal winner was Willie Mason.

Players and statistics
Updated as at round three of the 2023 NRL season.
Players listed in cap order as allocated by the club (see more).

First Grade Captains (since 1955)

References

Woods B (2007). El Magic - The Life of Hazem El Masri. Harper Collins Publishing. 
Andrews M (2006). The ABC of Rugby League. ABC Publishing. 
Whiticker A & Hudson G (2005). Canterbury Bulldogs - The Encyclopedia of Rugby League Players. Bas Publishing. 
Whittaker A & Collis I (2004). The History of Rugby League Clubs. 
Lane D (1996). A Family Betrayal - One Man's Super League War - Jarred McCracken. Ironbark Publishing. 
Chesterton R (1996). Good as Gould - Phil Gould's Stormy Life in Football. Ironbark Publishing. 
Lester G (1991). The Bulldog Story.  Publishing. 
Whiticker A (1992). The Terry Lamb Story. Gary Allen Publishing. 
Tasker N (1988). Top-Dog - The Steve Mortimer Story. Century Hutchinson Publishing.   
Lester G (1985). Berries to Bulldogs. Lester - Townsend Publishing. 
NRL Official Information Handbook (2001–2007). Season Guide.
Middleton D (1987–2006). The Official NSWRL, ARL, NRL Yearbook / Annual.
Christensen EE (1946–1977). NSWRL Yearbook.
Rugby League Review (2003–2007).
Big League (1974–2007).
Rugby League Week (1970–2007).
The Rugby League News.

External links
Bulldogs official website
Bulldogs History Database - Players
Official Bulldogs Team Store
Bulldogs Statistics
Back to Belmore - The Official Campaign Website

 
Lists of Australian rugby league players
National Rugby League lists
Sydney-sport-related lists